Goldhawk Road is a road in west London, which starts at Shepherd's Bush and travels west. There are numerous shops, restaurants and businesses lining the road, which forms the southern boundary of Shepherd's Bush Green. It is designated part of the A402 road.

History

Goldhawk Road's name derives from one John Goldhawk, who in the late 14th century held extensive estates in Fulham.

Goldhawk Road was of little note until the mid-seventeenth century, when a cottage on the street became the home of Miles Sindercombe, a Roundhead who in 1657 made several attempts to assassinate Oliver Cromwell. Sindercombe planned to ambush the Lord Protector using a specially built machine with muskets fixed to a frame. His plan failed and Sindercombe was sentenced to death. His cottage was demolished in the 1760s.

A map of London dated 1841 shows Goldhawk Road forming the southern boundary of Shepherd's Bush Green. At that time Shepherd's Bush was still largely undeveloped and chiefly rural in character, with much open farmland compared to fast-developing Hammersmith, and several ponds or small lakes. Scattered buildings are shown, mostly lining the main thoroughfares of Wood Lane, Cumberland Road (now the Uxbridge Road) and Goldhawk Road.

From 1939 until 1999 Queen Charlotte's Hospital was situated in Goldhawk Road.

Railways

Goldhawk Road station

Goldhawk Road tube station is a London Underground station located in the London Borough of Hammersmith and Fulham, on the south side of Goldhawk Road, about 250m west of Shepherd's Bush Green. It is on the Hammersmith & City and Circle lines in Travelcard Zone 2. It is also the least used station for both lines.

Original 1914 station
Although the line here was opened in 1864, a station was not opened at this location until 1 April 1914, when Shepherd's Bush station (now Shepherd's Bush Market) was moved from its original location between Uxbridge Road and Goldhawk Road, to a location on the north side of Uxbridge Road.

Stamford Brook station
Stamford Brook Underground station, though located in the London Borough of Hounslow, also has its main entrance in Goldhawk Road, near the Chiswick end.

In popular culture
 
In Steptoe and Son, "Seance in a Wet Rag and Bone Yard", Harold's father, Albert, relates that he has attended seances "at Madame Fontana's on the Goldhawk Road".  In the radio episode "Porn Yesterday" Albert reveals that he was photographed for a 'What the Butler Saw' in an old photographer's shed on the Goldhawk Road.

In the track "Love is a Bourgeois Construct" from their 2013 album Electric, Pet Shop Boys reference Goldhawk Road: "I've been hanging out with various riff-raff, somewhere on the Goldhawk Road, I don't think it's gonna be much longer, 'til I'm mugging up on the penal code".

In their single Green Fields, The Good, the Bad & the Queen reference the Goldhawk Road: "I wrote this song years ago, late at night somewhere on the Goldhawk Road. I was never sure how or why."

See also
Goldhawk Road tube station
History of Shepherd's Bush
Shepherd's Bush
Shepherd's Bush Market

Notes

References
 Denny, Barbara, Hammersmith and Shepherd's Bush Past, Historical Publications Ltd, London (1995),

External links

Shepherd's Bush Blog - Goldhawk Road buildings to be demolished Retrieved January 2012

Streets in the London Borough of Hammersmith and Fulham